Lucić is a Croatian and Serbian surname which may refer to:

 Hanibal Lucić (c.1485–1553), Croatian Renaissance poet and playwright
 Igor Lucić (b. 1991), Serbian rower
 Josip Lucić (b. 1957), Croatian general
 Predrag Lucić (1964–2018), Croatian journalist known for Feral Tribune

Croatian surnames
Serbian surnames
Slavic-language surnames
Patronymic surnames